Dasvi is a 2022 Indian Hindi-language social comedy film directed by debutante Tushar Jalota and produced by Dinesh Vijan under his banner Maddock Films in collaboration with Jio Studios as well as Shobhna Yadav and Sandeep Leyzell under Bake My Cake Films. It stars Abhishek Bachchan, Yami Gautam and Nimrat Kaur.
Bachchan plays the role of an uneducated politician, with Gautam as an IPS officer. The film premiered on Netflix and JioCinema on 7 April 2022. Famous poet and politician Dr. Kumar Vishwas served as the script and dialogue consultant. The film received mixed reviews with praise for its storyline, humour, performances and social message but criticism for its inconsistency in its screenplay.

Abhishek Bachchan won Best Actor (Male) for his performance at the 2022 Filmfare OTT Awards

Plot 
Ganga Ram Chaudhary, the charismatic and arrogant Chief Minister of the fictional state of Harit Pradesh, is implicated in a scam and remanded to judicial custody. He appoints his wife Bimla Devi "Bimmo" Chaudhary as CM until he can post bail. Initially meek and subservient, Bimmo quickly learns the ropes and establishes herself as a powerful politician, undergoing an image makeover in the process. Meanwhile, Chaudhary's popularity and street-smarts gain him a following in jail and he receives preferential treatment. When Jyoti Deswal, a new superintendent, arrives at the jail, Chaudhary's life takes a turn for the worse. Incorruptible and no-nonsense, Jyoti revokes Chaudhary's privileges and treats him like any other prisoner. Chaudhary's attempts to bribe a judge fail, and his immediate bail request is denied.

Following a confrontation, Jyoti embarrasses Chaudhary by evoking his lack of education - he dropped out in 8th grade - and puts him to work in the prison workshop making chairs as he is unqualified for any other work. Spurred by this and by the fact that prisoners attempting to gain a 10th-grade diploma are exempt from work, Chaudhary resolves to study and clear the 10th-grade exams to gain his high-school diploma. Jyoti believes this is a scam, but her hands are tied as Indian Law grants Chaudhary the right to complete his education. Chaudhary struggles to stay engaged in his studies, frequently falling asleep, until he is inspired by a history textbook detailing India's struggle for independence; he begins to take his studies much more seriously. He declares that if he cannot clear his exams, he will not re-enter Politics.

Meanwhile, Bimmo grows ambitious and plots to make her interim post permanent, suggesting to Chaudhary that he feign mental illness to gain asylum in a lavish hospital. Jyoti foils this by exposing Chaudhary's lies, saving his political career in the process (as people proved to be mentally unfit are disqualified from contesting elections). When Chaudhary suffers a minor heart attack, Jyoti saves him by performing CPR, drawing Bimmo's ire. Chaudhary progresses in his studies with help from inmates he has befriended, but struggles in Hindi as he seems to have dyslexic issues with respect to Hindi language and cannot visualize the alphabet. Bimmo meanwhile tries to make passing the exams difficult for Chaudhary, by arranging the release of the prisoner who is helping him with Science, and setting the Examination Time Table in such a way that Hindi exam comes first. Jyoti, beginning to see the change in character that the focus on education has brought on in Chaudhary, agrees to help him. As they make progress, they develop mutual respect.

Chaudhary's bail application is processed and he is cleared for release, but Jyoti hides this from him so he can focus on his studies. Chaudhary appears for his exams but is uncertain of how he has performed. When he is released, he finds out about Jyoti hiding the sanctioning of his bail application. When Jyoti remarks how education has changed him for the better and advises him to help the public with his newly acquired education, Chaudhary brushes her off and tells her that he'll never change; Jyoti is disappointed by his intransigence. But when Chaudhary returns to the political arena, he discovers that Bimmo has usurped the CM chair and he has no support in his own party. None of his ministers want to endanger their position by taking his side in the couple-struggle. This makes Chaudhary join the coalition party in the government, and topples the government. General elections are declared, and all groups campgain vigorously. The election results and exam results are due on the same day. While votes are being counted, Chaudhary rushes back to jail to discover that he has passed the exams. As a token of gratitude, he gifts Jyoti a chair that he'd made in the workshop as her Gurudakshina (traditionally a gift given by a student to a teacher). His new party wins the election and Chaudhary reconciles with Bimmo. He refuses the Chief Minister post and chooses to become the Minister of Education instead. During his oath ceremony, he makes it a point to convey his gratitude to Jyoti and the other inmates who helped him clear the exams.

Cast 
 Abhishek Bachchan as Chief Minister Ganga Ram Chaudhary
 Yami Gautam as IPS Jyoti Deswal 
 Nimrat Kaur as Bimla Devi "Bimmo" Chaudhary
 Manu Rishi Chaddha as Satpal Tomar
 Abhimanyu Yadav as Goonga 
 Arun Kushwah as Ghanti 
 Chittaranjan Tripathy as Tandon; IAS officer and Chief Minister's secretary
 Danish Husain as Rai Bareli; librarian
 Sumit Shekhar Rai as Prem Qaidi
 Rohit Tiwari as Inaamdar
 Mubashir Bashir Beigh
 Dhanveer Singh as Atul Chaudhary, Ganga Ram's brother
 Sachin Shroff as Sandeep Sangwan, Opposition Party's Leader
 Aditi Vats as Bimla Devi's manager
 Shivankit Singh Parihar as Kavish Kumar, a news reporter
 Shakti Singh as Chandra Shekhar Azad
 Shobhna Yadav as herself, ABP News anchor

Production 
The principal photography begun on 22 February 2021 in Agra.

Soundtrack 

The music of the film is composed by Sachin–Jigar with lyrics  written by Amitabh Bhattacharya and Ashish Pandit.

Reception 
Sukanya Verma of Rediff.com gave the film a rating of 3 out 5 stars and wrote "Abhishek packs a punch and Nimrat is deliciously wicked, but Dasvi falls short of being the razor-sharp satire it deeply aspires to be". Bharathi Pradhan of Lehren rated the film 3 out of 5 stars and wrote "Dasvi is like an average exam paper – some are expected, some catch you by surprise, you get some right and you get some wrong". Renuka Vyavahare of The Times of India rated the film 2.5/5 and wrote "Dasvi has a noble intent but that doesn't translate into a engaging movie". Shubhra Gupta of Indian Express gave the film a rating of 2.5/5 and wrote "Abhishek Bachchan is a perfect match for the kind of character he is playing. It's a pity that the material never quite knows whether it is an exaggerated parody or a sharp comedy with realistic overtones". Shubham Kulkarni of Koimoi rated the film 2.5/5 and wrote "What should have been a moving film turns out unintentionally funny". Avinash Lohana of Pinkvilla rated the film 2.5/5 and wrote "when you see the film it is evident that the makers wanted to strike the right balance between conveying a message and entertaining the audience, but it ends up being more preachy than anything else".

Anna MM Vetticad of Firstpost rated the film 2.5/5 and wrote "Dasvi – part fun, largely skimming over the surface of its concerns and characters, but with just enough going for it to make it a mildly entertaining experience". Taran Adarsh of Bollywood Hungama rated the film 2.5/5 and wrote "While Dasvi rests on an interesting story, message, and the impressive performances by the three leading actors, it turns out to be an average fare due to the flawed script". Grace Cyril of India Today gave the film a rating of 2/5 and wrote "Abhishek Bachchan has done an impressive job as a Haryanvi politician in Dasvi. However, the film's story fails to achieve its purpose". Saibal Chatterjee of NDTV rated the film 1.5/5 and wrote "It approaches the job with too much seriousness and takes all the fun out of the exercise in the bargain".

References 

Abhishek Bachchan starrer 'Dasvi', Family Entertainer; Comedy with a Social Message towards Essence of Education

External links 
 
 Dasvi at Bollywood Hungama

2020s Hindi-language films
2022 films
Films not released in theaters due to the COVID-19 pandemic
Indian direct-to-video films
Hindi-language Netflix original films
2022 comedy films
Indian comedy films
Hindi-language comedy films